The Yellow Cab Man is a 1950 comedy film directed by Jack Donohue and starring Red Skelton, Gloria DeHaven and Edward Arnold. The inventor of unbreakable glass ("Elastiglass") tries to sell it to a taxicab company, hoping that they will make unbreakable windshields.

A brief sequence of distorted visual effects in the film is the work of the photographer Weegee, who also makes a cameo appearance as a cab driver.

Cast
Red Skelton as Augustus 'Red' Pirdy
Gloria DeHaven as Ellen Goodrich (as Gloria De Haven)
Edward Arnold as Martin Creavy
Walter Slezak as Dr. Byron Dokstedder
James Gleason as Mickey Corkins
Jay C. Flippen as Hugo
Paul Harvey as Pearson Hendricks
Herbert Anderson as Willis Tomlin (as Guy Anderson)
John Butler as Gimpy
John Indrisano as Danny
Polly Moran as Bride's mother

Reception
According to MGM the film earned $1,951,000 in the US and Canada and $648,000 elsewhere, leading to a profit of $545,000.

References

External links

 
 

1950 films
1950 comedy films
American comedy films
American black-and-white films
Yellow Cab Company
Metro-Goldwyn-Mayer films
Films directed by Jack Donohue
Films scored by Scott Bradley
1950s English-language films
1950s American films